Tuqtu (Quechua for "broody hen", also spelled Tucto) is a mountain  in the Andes of Peru. The mountain is located in the Cusco Region, Canas Province, Quehue District, and in the Chumbivilcas Province, Livitaca District. Annually the Tupay Tuqtu festival which has been declared a National Cultura Heritage takes places at the mountain.

Southwest of  Tuqtu, also on the border of the provinces of Canas and Chumbivilcas, there is a  peak named Tuqtu (Tocto).

References 

Mountains of Peru
Mountains of Cusco Region